Paola Mautino Ruiz (born 1 June 1990) is a Peruvian athlete competing in the long jump and sprinting events. She competed at the 2015 World Championships in Beijing without qualifying for the final.
 
Her personal best in the long jump is 6.66 metres (+1.5 m/s) set in Cochabamba in 2018, which is the current national record.

Competition record

Personal bests
100 metres – 11.76 (-1.5 m/s, Cochabamba 2018)
200 metres – 25.21 (0.0 m/s, Cochabamba 2010)
Long jump – 6.66 (+1.5 m/s, Cochabamba 2018)

References

Female long jumpers
Peruvian female sprinters
Peruvian long jumpers
Living people
Place of birth missing (living people)
1990 births
World Athletics Championships athletes for Peru
Athletes (track and field) at the 2015 Pan American Games
Athletes (track and field) at the 2019 Pan American Games
Pan American Games competitors for Peru
Athletes (track and field) at the 2018 South American Games
South American Games gold medalists for Peru
South American Games bronze medalists for Peru
South American Games medalists in athletics
Ibero-American Championships in Athletics winners
South American Games gold medalists in athletics
21st-century Peruvian women